EGSD may refer to:

 East Greenwich School Department, a public school district located in East Greenwich, Rhode Island
 EGSD, the ICAO code for Great Yarmouth – North Denes Airport, Great Yarmouth, England